Liga Mayor de Fútbol Nacional, known more commonly as just Liga Mayor was one of the two amateur football leagues in Puerto Rico played during the late 1990s and early 2000s. In 2005 the league became defunct as the Federación Puertorriqueña de Fútbol unified the domestic football scene in the country to form the Campeonato Nacional de Fútbol.

Champions

 1997 - Leones
 1998 - Islanders 
 1999 - Islanders
 2000 - Vaqueros 
 2001 - Islanders
 2002 - Vaqueros 
 2003 - Sporting 
 2004 - Sporting
 2005 - Real Quintana

External links
 Puerto Rico - List of Champions, RSSSF.com

Defunct football leagues in Puerto Rico